Labochirus is a genus of Thelyphonid whip scorpions, first described by Reginald Innes Pocock in 1894.

Species 
, the World Uropygi Catalog accepts the following three species:

 Labochirus cervinus Pocock, 1899 – India
 Labochirus proboscideus (Butler, 1872) – Sri Lanka
 Labochirus tauricornis Pocock, 1900 – India

References 

Arachnid genera
Uropygi